Huruiești is a commune in Bacău County, Western Moldavia, Romania. It is composed of seven villages: Căpotești, Florești, Fundoaia, Huruiești, Ocheni, Perchiu and Prădaiș.

Natives
 Vasile Pârvan

References

Communes in Bacău County
Localities in Western Moldavia